The 328th Air Refueling Squadron is an Air Force Reserve Command unit of the 914th Air Refueling Wing at Niagara Falls International Airport, Niagara, New York.  It operates KC-135R Stratotanker aircraft refueling United States Air Force aircraft worldwide.

History

World War II
Constituted as 3 Combat Cargo Squadron on 11 April 1944. Activated on 15 April 1944 at Bowman Field, KY with C-47 transports. The 328th transported personnel and supplies, primarily to forward areas, and evacuated casualties in the China-Burma-India Theater from 16 September 1944 to 11 November 1945. Redesignated as 328 Troop Carrier Squadron on 29 Sep 1945. Inactivated on 20 Dec 1945. Redesignated as 328 Troop Carrier Squadron, Medium on 4 August 1949. Activated in the Reserve on 2 September 1949, with C-46 aircraft at Reading Municipal Airport, PA.

Ordered to Active Service on 15 March 1951, at New Castle County Airport, DE, 1 May 1950 – 1 April 1951 . Inactivated on 1 April 1951. Activated in the Reserve on 14 June 1952, at New Castle County Aprt, DE. Move to Paine AFB on 16 Nov 1957, WA. Ordered to Active Service on 28 Oct 1962. Relieved from Active Duty on 28 Nov 1962. Redesignated as: 328 Tactical Airlift Squadron on 1 July 1967; convert to [C- 130 aircraft in 1971. 

Redesignated 328 Airlift Squadron on 1 February 1992; 328 Air Refueling Squadron on 1 June 2017. Niagara Falls Municipal  Airport (later, Niagara Falls Intl Airport; Niagara Falls IAP-ARS), NY, 25 March 1958-. Currently operating KC-135R tanker aircraft.

Operations
World War II
Vietnam War
Operation Desert Storm
Operation Provide Promise
Operation Allied Force
 Operation Joint Guard
Operation Enduring Freedom
Operation Iraqi Freedom

Lineage
 Constituted as the 3d Combat Cargo Squadron on 11 April 1944
 Activated on 15 April 1944
 Redesignated 328th Troop Carrier Squadron on 29 September 1945
 Inactivated on 20 December 1945
 Redesignated 328th Troop Carrier Squadron, Medium on 4 August 1949
 Activated in the reserve on 2 September 1949
 Ordered to active service on 15 March 1951
 Inactivated on 1 April 1951
 Activated in the reserve on 14 June 1952
 Ordered to active service on 28 October 1962
 Relieved from active service on 28 November 1962
 Redesignated 328th Tactical Airlift Squadron on 1 July 1967
 Redesignated 328th Airlift Squadron on 1 February 1992
 Redesignated 328th Air Refueling Squadron on 1 June 2017

Assignments
 1st Combat Cargo Group (later 512th Troop Carrier Group), 15 April 1944 – 26 December 1945 (attached to India-China Division, Air Transport Command, 23 June – 20 August 1945; 69th Composite Wing, 25 August – 10 November 1945)
 512th Troop Carrier Group, 2 September 1949 – 1 April 1951
 512th Troop Carrier Group, 14 June 1952
 349th Troop Carrier Group, 16 November 1957
 512th Troop Carrier Group, 15 March 1957
 512th Troop Carrier Wing, 14 April 1959
 914th Troop Carrier Group (later 914th Tactical Airlift Group, 914th Airlift Group), 11 February 1963
 914th Operations Group, 1 August 1992 – present

Stations

 Bowman Field, Kentucky, 15 April 1944
 Baer Field, Indiana, 5–11 August 1944
 Sylhet Airport, India (now Bangla Desh), 30 August 1944 (detachment operated from Yunnani, China, 16 September-2 October 1944)
 Tulihal Airport, India, 18 October 1944
 Hathazari Airfield, India (now Bangla Desh), 7 April 1945
 Myitkyina Airport, Burma, 1 June 1945
 Luliang Air Base, China, 25 August 1945

 Kunming Airport, 4 September 1945
 Kharagpur Airfield, India, 15 November – 20 December 1945
 Reading Municipal Airport, Pennsylvania, 2 September 1949
 New Castle County Airport, Delaware, 1 May 1950 – 1 April 1951
 New Castle County Airport, Delaware, 14 June 1952
 Paine Air Force Base, Washington, 16 November 1957
 Niagara Falls Municipal Airport (later Niagara Falls International Airport, Niagara Falls Air Reserve Station), New York, 25 March 1958 – present

Aircraft
 Douglas C-47 Skytrain (1944–1945)
 Curtiss C-46 Commando (1949–1951, 1952–1958)
 Fairchild C-119 Flying Boxcar (1957–1971)
 Lockheed C-130 Hercules (1971–2017)
 Boeing KC-135 (2017-present)

References

Notes
 Explanatory notes

 Citations

Bibliography

 
 
 

Military units and formations in New York (state)
1944 establishments in Kentucky
Air refueling squadrons of the United States Air Force